Thomas Felix "Tim" Curran (12 February 1875 – 14 September 1915) was an Australian rules footballer who played with Fitzroy and St Kilda.

Sources
Holmesby, Russell & Main, Jim (2009). The Encyclopedia of AFL Footballers. 8th ed. Melbourne: Bas Publishing.

1875 births
1915 deaths
Australian rules footballers from Victoria (Australia)
Fitzroy Football Club players
St Kilda Football Club players